Nehrungisch is a subdialect (Mundart) of Low Prussian, belonging to the Low German language variety. It was spoken in East Prussia and West Prussia, in the region around the Vistula Spit (Frische Nehrung) near Gdansk. The easternmost locality where this variety was spoken was Narmeln, and it was spoken from Narmeln to Krakau (Krakowiec). The dialect survives in Chortitza-Plautdietsch, a dialect of Low Prussian brought to Ukraine by migrants from the Vistula region. Nehrungisch shares features with Eastern Low Prussian.

History 
Those of the Mennonites from the Vistula lowlands, that originated from the lower part of the Rhine belonged together with those from Gdańsk (Danzig), Elbląg (Elbing), and the Żuławy Gdańskie (Danziger Werder) and entered the larger area in the second half of the 1540s. 

The Chortitza Colony Plautdietsch language had no major linguistic difference from the original Nehrungisch, which had changed by 1880. By then, the most conspicuous features (such as /eiw/ for /au/) were limited to the Vistula Spit. Most residents of the colony were from the spit. Sommerfelder, Reinländer Mennoniten Gemeinde, Evangelical Mennonite Mission Conference and the Gospel Mennonite Church are of Chortitza origin. Many south Mexican members of the Kleine Gemeinde are defectors from the Old Colony Mennonites. Samlandic was spoken between Narmeln and Neutief. A number of words known on the Vistula Spit only in the 20th century were used in Danzig and the Weichselwerder at the beginning of the 19th century.

The Pokraken congregation in East Prussia, members of Frisian congregations, migrated from West Prussia in 1713. It settled in Pokraken (present-day Leninskoye), Plauschwaren, Grigolienen, Bogdahnen, Neusorge, Sköpen (present-day Mostovoe), Elbings Kolonie (present-day Bolshaya Nemoninka), Grüneberg, Klubien and Allekneiten. Daughter colonies in northeastern Russia included Arkadak (with the villages of Wladmirowka,  Borisopol, Dmitrowka, Marianowka, Wjasemskoje, Leonidowka and Lidjewka) and Orenburg (with the villages of Chortitza, Petrowka, Kanzerowka, Kamenka, Dejewka, Nikolajewka, Feodorowka, Romanowka, Dolinowka, Rodnitschnoje, Dobrowka, Kitschkas, Suworowka, and Pretoria). Daughter colonies in Ukraine included Judenplan, Großfürstenland (with the villages of Georgstal, Sergejewka, Alexandertal, Michaelsburg, Olgafeld and Rosenbach), Bergtal (with the villages of Bergtal-Bodnja, Schönfeld, Schöntal, Heubuden and Friedrichstal), Tschornoglas (with the village of Gerhardstal), Borsenko (with the villages of Nowo-Sofiewka, Mariapol, Blumenfeld, Steinau, Hamburg, Neubergtal, Hoffnungsort), Nikolaipol (with the villages of Nikolaipol, Eichenfeld-Dubowka, Morosowo, Adelsheim-Dolinowka, Warwarowka, Tschistopol, Paulsheim-Pawlowka, Nadeshdowka [Iwangorod] and Jenelowka), Neplujewka (Starosawodskoje and Kislitschwewataja), Kusmitzky (with the village of Alexandrowka), Andreasfeld (with the village of Andreasfeld), Neu-Schönsee (with the village of Neu-Schönwise), Eugenfeld (with the village of Eugenfeld), Baratow (with the villages of Nowaja-Chortitza and Wodjanaja), Schlachtin (with the villages of Selenopol and Kamenopol), Neurosengart (with the villages of Neurosengart and Kronsfeld), Wiesenfeld (with the village of Wiesenfeld), Miloradowka (with the villages of Miloradowka and Jekaterinowka), Ignatjewo (with the villages of New Jork, Nikolajewka, Ignatjewo, Leonidowka, Romanowka, Jekaterinwoka and Alexejewka), Borissowo (with the villages of Ljubomirowka, Kondratjewka and Nioklaipol), Naumenko (with Grigorjewka, Petrowka, Wassiljewka and Jelenowka), Zentral (with the village of Zentral) and Sadowaja (with the village of Anna).

Villages in West Reserve, Canada 
Furstenthal and Bergthal villages in West Reserve included the following:

Bergfeld
Blumenfeld
Blumengart
Blumenhof
Blumenort, Manitoba 
Edenburg
Einlage
Grünfeld
Grunthal, Manitoba
Hochfeld, Manitoba 
Kleefeld, Manitoba
Kronsfeld
Lichtfeld
Neuendorf
Neuhorst
Posenort
Reinland
Rosenfeld, Manitoba
Rosengart
Rosenthal
Schöndorf
Schönfeld
Schönriese
Schönthal
Silberfeld
Waldheim
Zichenfeld
Zigenhof

Phonology 
The Chortitza-Plautdietsch reflex in Mexico of off-glide of words such as OA is usually [w] < [ɣ] (e.g. Foagel 'fowl' [fɛwl] < [fœɑɣl]). 
It is sometimes [ɹ] before voiceless velar consonants  (e.g. Knoaken 'bone' [knɛɹkn]<[knœɑken]).

Vowels 
Nehrungisch has /i/ before /nt/ in words such as kint (child). It has non-velar /a/ as /au/. In originally-closed syllables, except before original /r/, /ld/ and /lp/, /e/ is the front vowel /a/. The Middle Low German /û/ became /yɐ/ before /r/ in Chortitza-Plautdietsch. It has a shortened /u/ before gutturals.

Nehrungisch and Chortitza-Plautdietsch have /ê/ instead of /au/ (/a/ otherwise). Chortitza-Plautdietsch is spoken in Mexico, in Altkolonie and Blumenau.

The west of the Nehrung had /ōe/ for the /ēo/ of the eas, for example krōech/krēoch for High German languages' Krug and kōechen/kēochen for High German Kuchen. Few Chortitza varieties have front vowels. Many Mexican speakers of Plautdietsch have [iː] for words such as äkj, merging with [iː] in words such as biet. Chortitza-related <oa> diphthongs before velars are œɐ, ɛɐ, øɐ, eɐœʊ, ɛʊ, øʊ and eʊ.

Consonants 
Chortitza-Plautdietsch has lost /r/ before dental consonants as an off-glide. The /n/ of /an/, /un/, and /in/ is lost before /r/, /l/, /m/ and /n/. It exhibits rhotacisation of /d/ between vowels as /r/.

Flemish influence 
In the coastal area from Gdańsk to Elbląg, Flemish Mennonites predominated. Palatised vowels in Chortitza-Plautdietsch derived from East Flemish. Nehrungisch and Chortitza-Plautdietsch palatise velar vowels. East Flemish has long /o/ as /y.ə/ and Chortitza-Plautdietsch has long /o/ before /g, k and ch/. Nehrungisch and Chortitza-Plautdietsch have the plural ending /-en/, possibly influenced by Dutch.
Most of the early Mennonite settlers in Ukraine were Flemish Mennonites from the northern delta (Nehrung) region.

Palatalisation 
Nehrungisch's palatalisation more likely originated in the Baltic and West Prussia than from Frisian. Chortitza-Plautdietsch has palatalisation (/kj/ and /gj/), which probably also existed in West Prussia. The eastern Nehrung and Tiegenhofer Niederung had slight palatalization (/k/ to /kj/), particularly in the diminutive ending /-ke/ (such as frǖkjen for High German Frauchen and maunkjen for High German Mannchen).

Descendants of those who left the Chortitza Colony for the Orenburg Colony in 1894 have the palatalization of Molotschna Plautdietsch: /c/ and /ɟ/. This was probably due to the foundation of a colony by people from Molotschna Colony near the Orenburg Colony in 1895 and the introduction of four years of alternative service in forestry for Mennonite men in the 1870s. Chortitza-Plautdietsch has the palatal oral stops <kj> and <gj>. Lenition of the voiced palatal oral stop, accompanied by lowering and lengthening the preceding BITT class, is common in southern Mexico. Some speakers have raised allophones of the BITT class before all palatal stops, but only the ones before voiced palatal stops develop into closing diphthongs. Many voiced palatal oral stops, accompanied by lowering and lengthening of the preceding vowels, occur in southern Mexico. Some speakers have raised allophones of vowels before palatal stops, but only those before voiced palatal stops develop into closing diphthongs.

Isoglosses 
Isoglosses in the original dialect area are:
/a/ primarily /au/
Shortened /u/ in words such as hupe have no shortened /u/ before /p/.
/n/-loss in kannst
Long /o/ is shortened before /l+dental/; umlaut lacking in words such as kaufen
Final /-n/
/l/-loss in willst and sollstLoss of /n/ in /an-/, /in-/, /un-/ before the fricatives /r, l, m, n and g/.büten, dün, glüpen etc. versus buten, dun, glupen etc. haiwen, blaif etc. versus haue, blau etc. Most of the dialect has High German /au/ as /eiw/, in words such as greiw (High German grau, English grey), in contrast to Werdersch and Molotschna-Plautdietsch.

 Grammar 
Chortitza-Plautdietsch has an accusative case. The Low Prussian dialect has accusative and dative cases. Chortitza-Plautdietsch has eant for "them". It has formal address using the second-person pronoun jie. Chortitza-Plautdietsch's infinitives and plurals end in -en. For verbs with two preterite forms, it frequently uses the former conjunctive. Chortitza-Plautdietsch has double infinitive forms, and a participle of the verb to be. It has han for the infinitive "to have". Chortitza-Plautdietsch has the infinitive and first-person singular and plural of "to be" (senn) and "to have" (han).

 Diaspora 
Chihuahua, Texas and Bolivia's Santa Cruz Department have Nehrungisch-speaking residents. Plautdietsch speakers in Belize speak Chortitza-Plautdietsch. Mennonites arriving in the country since 1958 were Mexican Old Colony Sommerfelder and Kleine Gemeinde. Some migrated to Canada or northern Mexico. 

Descendants of those who left Chortitza for Canada in the 1870s (who live in many Latin American countries) have weak palatalization. In 1891, Manitoba Bergthal families arrived in Saskatchewan. During the 1940s, Manitoba and Saskatchewan Altkolonie Mennonites began to emigrate to northern Mexico. Spoken Plautdietsch in Mexico, Bolivia and Texas differs from that in Canada. Chortitza-Plautdietsch is spoken in Paraguay's Menno Colony. Reinfeld Colony in the country's Misiones Department was founded by people from Paraguay's Sommerfeld and Bergthal settlements. In Mexico, the use of Chortitza-Plautdietsch depends on whether a speaker is one of the Old Colony Mennonites. Nineteenth-century Mennonite migrants to Canada primarily came from the Chortitza Colony.

Many speakers of Plautdietsch exhibit features of Chortitza- and Molotschna-Plautdietsch. Phonological differences exist between the Plautdietsch of Catholics and Mennonites in Canada's Saskatchewan Valley. These include [iəә] for the phoneme /ea/ wea (was) and Pead'' (horses) for Mennonite speakers; Catholic speakers use [eəә], traced to Ukraine. Lexical differences also exist. The central cluster around the South Saskatchewan River is largely in the core Old Colony and Bergthaler settlement region, demarcated by the boundaries of the Hague-Osler Mennonite Reserve. The peripheral cluster in the northern and western valley encompasses areas primarily settled by Russländer immigrants after the mass emigration of Old Colony and Bergthaler Mennonites to Latin America in the 1920s. In 1983, conservative Mennonites in northern Mexico began moving to the south of the country. Some Belizean Mennonites formed communities such as those in Quintana Roo; others they joined preexisting Mexican congregations, such as those in Campeche. 

Mexican Mennonites settled in Seminole, Texas (moving north from the original 1870s settlement), Oklahoma and Kansas.  In 2005, it was estimated that there were An estimated 5,000 Mennonites of Latin American origin (Keel 2006) lived in southwestern Kansas in 2005, centered around Meade. 

Non-Chortitza groups in Mexico have adopted many of the original settlers' Chortitza features. Mennonites in Campeche are predominantly Old Colony Mennonites, with Sommerfeld and Kleine Gemeinde Mennonites. Old Colony Mennonites from northern Mexico entered the Chenes region in greater numbers during the 1980s, and other Mennonite groups eventually moved into the region. Old Colony Mennonites predominate, with Sommerfeld and Kleine Gemeinde communities; an Evangelical Mennonite Conference community is much smaller than the others. Old Colony and Sommerfeld Mennonites are primarily from the states of Durango, Zacatecas, and Chihuahua; the Kleine Gemeinde includes members from Tamaulipas and Belize.  About 6,000 Mennonites in Gaines County, Texas speak Plautdietsch, and 5,000 Mennonite residents of southwestern Kansas are of Latin American origin.

Bergthal Mennonites 
Their congregations used to include:
Altona, Manitoba
Arden, Manitoba
Carman, Manitoba
Gladstone, Manitoba
Graysville, Manitoba
Gretna, Manitoba
Grunthal, Manitoba
Halbstadt, Manitoba
Homewood, Manitoba
Kane, Manitoba
Lowe Farm
MacGregor, Manitoba
Morris, Manitoba
Morden, Manitoba
Plum Coulee
Rosenfeld, Manitoba
Steinbach, Manitoba
Winkler, Manitoba (two)
Winnipeg

Surnames 
This is a list of surnames common among Mennonites in Canada who originate indirectly from Russia, in order of descending frequency. Numbers in brackets indicate a surname's place on a 21-entry list of West Prussian Mennonite surnames. 
Friesen (16) 
Dyck (1) 
Wiebe (2) 
Reimer (12) 
Neufeld (7) 
Derksen 
Peters 
Thiessen 
Giesbrecht  
Löwen  
Hildebrand  
Hiebert  
Töws  
Sawatzky  
Fehr 

Flemish surnames include Andres, Claassen, Dieck, Driedger, Dyck, Enz, Epp, Esau, Fieguth, Harder, Loepp, Reimer, Thiessen, van Bergen,  van Riesen, Warkentin, Wiehler 
and Wölke. Grunau only occurred in congregations of Frisian Mennonites.
  Rahn/Raen/Rohn is a surname of Frisian congregations.

See also 
Mennonites in Bolivia
Mennonites in Belize
Mennonites in Mexico
Mennonites in Peru

References

Bibliography 

 
 
 
 
 
 
 
 
 
 

East Prussia
West Prussia
Low Prussian dialect
Languages of Poland
Languages of Ukraine